Palpita travassosi is a moth in the family Crambidae. It was described by Eugene G. Munroe in 1959. It is found in São Paulo, Brazil.

References

Moths described in 1959
Palpita
Moths of South America